Sai Ying Pun is a station on the MTR network. It serves the neighbourhood of Sai Ying Pun and the western part of Mid-Levels in northwestern Hong Kong Island, Hong Kong. Sai Ying Pun station was opened on 29 March 2015, completing the West Island line extension of the Island line.

History
Plans for the station first appeared in Hong Kong Mass Transit: Further Studies in 1970. It was to be built as part of the Island line in the 1980s, but construction of the line did not commence westwards beyond , due to inadequate forecast passenger numbers and technical difficulties identified by contractors.

Proposed locations
In Outline Zoning Plan No. S/H3/20, the Planning Department of the government indicated one possible location under Des Voeux Road West at Ko Shing Street as of December 2003. A ventilation shaft marked with MTR notices can be found at the intersection. A large void facing Des Voeux Road West, sealed, can also be found at a nearby medical centre, which some have speculated that it was reserved for a to-be-built exit. These findings suggest that this was original proposed location.

However, in proposals submitted to the government by the MTR in May 2002, the proposed station was shifted further west to the intersection of Des Voeux Road West and Water Street.

In March 2004, the MTR moved the station back east but south of the initial alignment under King George V Memorial Park. A source from the MTR Corporation (MTRC) revealed to the local newspaper Ming Pao that this location was chosen to avoid any nuisance during works under major roads. The location would also better suit the needs of Mid-Levels residents, the source said.

Design and construction
In 2009 the design and architecture work was awarded to Aedas in a joint venture with AECOM. In March 2010, it was awarded to a joint venture of Gammon Construction and Nishimatsu Construction (西松建設) for HK$4.7 billion. Construction commenced in 2010 and was completed in 2015. The station opened later than the other two on the West Island line due to construction delays resulting from soft ground conditions. Exit B3 construction was delayed for the same reason. Other elements of the construction included demolition of the Centre Street cooked food centre, the Ki Ling Lane children's playground, and the Whitty Street public toilet.

The station is home to a work of art entitled "Street Scenes of Sai Ying Pun", a collage of monochrome photos by artist Tse Ming-chong and the Hong Kong Youth Arts Foundation. It is located between the concourse and Exit B1/B2.

The pedestrian passage between Exit A and the concourse is very long, and has drawn complaints from some residents.

Island line western extension opened on 28 December 2014, but Sai Ying Pun station did not open until 29 March 2015.

Station layout

Entrances and exits
Sai Ying Pun station has a total of 6 entrances/exits. Like its neighbouring HKU station, the station is characterised by the long corridors linking the concourse with the exits, due to the fact that the station box is located underneath the Mid-Levels.

A1: Queen's Road West (near Sai Woo Lane), Ramada Hong Kong Harbour View, Tung Wah Hospital
A2: Des Voeux Road West, Sun Yat Sen Memorial Park, Eco Tree Hotel
B1: First Street, Centre Street Market
B2: Second Street, 1/F Centre Street Market, Island Crest
B3: Ki Ling Lane (ArtLane), Andes Plaza, Western District Headquarters and Police Station
C: Bonham Road, David Trench Rehabilitation Centre, Sai Ying Pun Community Complex

Exit B3 (Ki Ling Lane) opened on 27 March 2016; its construction was delayed by difficult ground conditions. Lifts were opened for public use on 25 June 2016.

In Popular culture
Sai Ying Pun Station was used as a filming location for several blockbuster films, including Cold War 2.

Web novelist Echo of Heart had also wrote Sai Ying Pun, a horror fantasy based on the station's postponement in service and the urban legends of the neighbouring Whitty Station and Rumsey Station.

References

Yung, Chester and Chung, Danny. "Western on the MTR track". (1 July 2005). The Standard.

External links

Notes for Outline Zoning Plan No. S/H3/20 (Planning Department) showing one of the possible locations
History of West Island Line (Hong Kong West Island Line Concern Group) information about the reserved space 

MTR stations on Hong Kong Island
Island line (MTR)
West Island line
Sai Ying Pun
Railway stations in Hong Kong opened in 2015